David Joseph Madden (December 17, 1931 – January 16, 2014) was a Canadian-born American actor. His most famous role came on the 1970s sitcom The Partridge Family, in which he played the group's manager, Reuben Kincaid, opposite Shirley Jones' character. Madden later had a recurring role as diner customer Earl Hicks on the mid-1970s to mid-1980s sitcom Alice.

Early life
Madden was born in Sarnia, Ontario, Canada, to Verna (née Burleigh) and Roger Madden. He had three older siblings: Sister Mary Roger (1919–), a practicing nun at Saint Mary-of-the-Woods in Indiana; Richard (1921–?); and Jack (1926–1948). He spent his early childhood in Port Huron, Michigan, and in 1939 was sent to live with his aunt and uncle, Bess and Frank Hoff, in Terre Haute, Indiana, after his father's death and his mother's job keeping her on the road. At age 13, a serious bicycle accident left him immobilized. Madden spent months recuperating, a time during which he took an interest in magic. He later worked magic into his comedy act, which he performed around Terre Haute. He graduated in 1950 from Otter Creek High School, where he served as joke editor of the school paper, writing his own material. Madden spent one semester at Indiana State Teachers College, and in 1951 dropped out to enlist in the United States Air Force. Assigned to Special Services, he was sent to Tripoli, Libya, where he was a hit as an entertainer in camp shows and native theater, even performing before Idris of Libya, the ruler at the time. After the Air Force, Madden attended the University of Miami, where he graduated with a degree in communications in 1959.

Career
After two unsuccessful years on the Southern nightclub circuit, Madden travelled to Los Angeles, where a successful opening night at a Beverly Hills nightclub led to a 10-week retention, and a recommendation by patron Frank Sinatra to Ed Sullivan, who signed Madden for three nights on The Ed Sullivan Show. These appearances led to his first real acting engagement, a spot on Camp Runamuck, in 1965.

Madden first gained national notice as a milk-drinking, confetti-throwing sad sack on Rowan & Martin's Laugh-In from 1968 to 1969. However, he became better known worldwide for his role as Reuben Kincaid, the harried manager/agent for The Partridge Family (1970–1974). Partridge co-star Danny Bonaduce, whom Madden took into his home during Bonaduce's family's domestic strife, has said that he owes a lot to Madden. In 1976, he appeared in Eat My Dust!, the first movie developed by Ron Howard.

Madden also made guest appearances on other television series, such as Bewitched, Happy Days, The Love Boat, Barney Miller (1978, episode: "Eviction", parts 1 and 2) and Fantasy Island. He had a recurring role on Alice as Tommy's basketball coach Earl Hicks, a regular at Mel's Diner. 

Madden began voicing several characters on Focus on the Family's children's radio drama Adventures in Odyssey in the late 1980s. In 1990, he received his own regular character in the curmudgeonly window-washer Bernard Walton, a character he continued to play until 2008.

In 1992, he reprised his role of Mr. Kincaid for a sketch on an episode of The Ben Stiller Show. Two years later, he appeared with Bonaduce in an episode of Married... with Children.

In 1995, Madden appeared on the sitcom Boy Meets World in the episode "Rave On". His last guest appearance was on Sabrina the Teenage Witch, where he played Dr. Egglehoffer along with other former Laugh-In cast members.

Madden did voice-over work for numerous television and radio commercials, including the Cornick Sister ads for Denny's from 1990 to 1993. Madden also narrated the opening title sequence for the FOX sitcom Herman's Head during the show's first two seasons.

Personal life
Madden married Nena Arnold in 1975. They had two children – an adopted daughter, Selena; and a son, Peter Michael – before divorcing in 1985.

Madden married his former college sweetheart Sandy Dempsey (Madden) on May 28, 1998.

While starring in The Partridge Family, Madden took an interest in photography. He would bring his camera onto the set to photograph the cast, crew and guest stars. This would become a lifelong hobby for him.

A long-time smoker, Madden quit after The Partridge Family episode "Each Dawn I Diet" (in which Danny and Reuben make a bet that Reuben can abstain from smoking longer than Danny can from eating "junk" food).

According to Madden, he did not get along with Shirley Jones' husband Marty Ingels; Madden and Jones had a limited relationship as a result.

Madden befriended many fellow actors over his career, including Jonathan Winters, Alan Young, Pat Morita, Henry Gibson, Dan Rowan, Richard Gautier, Arte Johnson, James Karen and Gary Owens, as well as all of his Partridge Family co-stars and the show's creator Bernard Slade. While in retirement, he wrote his autobiography Reuben on Wry: The Memoirs of Dave Madden.

Death
Madden died on January 16, 2014, in Jacksonville, Florida, where he was receiving hospice care, of complications of myelodysplastic syndrome. He was 82.

Filmography

Film

Television

Radio

Video games

References

External links
 

1931 births
2014 deaths
Deaths from myelodysplastic syndrome
American male film actors
American male radio actors
American male television actors
American male voice actors
American sketch comedians
Canadian emigrants to the United States
People from Sarnia
Male actors from Indiana
Indiana State University alumni
Actors from Terre Haute, Indiana
Male actors from Ontario
20th-century American male actors
21st-century American male actors
Deaths from multiple organ failure